Valpo may refer to:
Valparaiso, Chile
Valparaiso, Indiana, United States
Valparaiso University
Valparaiso Beacons, the school's athletic program

See also
Valparaiso (disambiguation)